INS Keshet has been borne by at least two ships of the Israeli Sea Corps:

 , a  launched in 1973 and sold to Chile in 1981
 , a  launched in 1982

Israeli Navy ship names